Dr. Helen Jean (Brown) Bromley (9 August 1903, in Beaumont – 16 June 1982, in Stamford) was an American botanist and phycologist noted for her study of the algal family Vaucheriaceae.  She earned her PhD from Ohio State University, in 1929.  She published using her maiden name, and served as both an instructor of botany and registrar at the University of Connecticut.  She was married to entomologist Stanley Willard Bromley.

Works

References 

1903 births
1982 deaths
American women botanists
20th-century American botanists
Phycologists
Women phycologists
20th-century American women scientists
People from Beaumont, Texas
Scientists from Texas
University of Connecticut faculty
American women academics
Ohio State University alumni